Disclose.tv is a far-right fake news website based in Germany. It is known for publishing disinformation and conspiracy theories.

The website was created in 2007 as a forum focused around conspiracy content such as UFOs and paranormal phenomena. In 2021, the website announced it would be operating exclusively as a news website. Currently, it presents itself as a news aggregator on its social media platforms and website. Its official Twitter account was found by the British anti-disinformation organisation Logically to share content from other sources without attribution, noting that over half of their eight most popular tweets featured no attribution as of January 2022.

History 

Archived versions of Disclose.tv were found as far back as March 2007 by Logically, a British anti-disinformation organisation. In its initial form, the website operated as a forum focusing on user-generated content discussing topics such as UFOs, paranormal phenomena and other conspiracy theories. The website's name references the concept of "disclosure" in the UFO community, referring to the time they believe the government will confirm the existence of aliens and release information about them.

In April 2012, Disclose.tv announced a redesign of its website. During the 2010s, Disclose.tv's content became more political, with users' posts on the site casting doubt on the Russian interference in the 2016 United States elections and criticising "social justice warriors", which Logically said was indicative of "the right-wing undercurrent of the community".

In 2019, Disclose.tv removed its user-written articles and switched to primarily hosting forums; the website presented some of the forum posts as news articles on its social media accounts. In September 2021, it removed its old versions and cleared out its Twitter, Facebook and YouTube accounts, and announced to its users that it would be operating exclusively as a news website. Logically found that around the same time, the website published news articles that were backdated to September 2020, and many of which were plagiarised from a combination of reliable sources and other conspiracy theory websites.

In January 2022, after Logically sent a request for comment during its investigation of the website, Disclose.tv published an unsigned statement claiming to have never heard of Logically, stating it had "lost sight" of the hateful content being posted on its Discord channel despite claiming to have moderators and bots searching for such posts, and apologizing for the examples of plagiarism listed in the investigation. The statement also included Logically reporter Ernie Piper's name. Logically noted that Disclose.tv had blocked many members of its editorial team on Twitter prior to the request for comment, despite claiming to have never heard of Logically. Piper said that the statement, part of which was described as being "ironic and mocking in tone", was "not a normal way for a media organization to respond to critical coverage", and added that it was "alarming" that Disclose.tv had published his name to its followers.

Influence 
As of 7 November 2022, Disclose.tv has social media accounts on Twitter (1 million followers), Telegram (438,000 followers), YouTube (12,000 followers) and Facebook (3 million followers), as well as the far-right platforms Gettr (612,000 followers) and Gab (199,000 followers). Disclose.tv also maintained a Discord channel, which was created in September 2021. As of 11 January 2022, the channel was closed after Logically sent a request for comment the previous day during its investigation of the website.

Miro Dittrich, a senior researcher for the Center for Monitoring, Analysis and Strategy (CeMAS), a German extremism monitoring agency, said that Disclose.tv "[was] an exception in terms of its reach" in relation to other fringe websites, and in how it was "trying to portray itself as not being a German outlet" and reusing American far-right sources' talking points. Dittrich and Stephan Mündges, the head of the Technical University of Dortmund's Journalism Institute, said that the biggest threat from outlets like Disclose.tv was their ability to present conspiracy theories, disinformation and misleading stories as factual news.

Content 
In its current form, Disclose.tv presents itself as a news aggregator on its social media platforms, sharing information from other sources, frequently without attribution or links to other news websites. Logically stated that the website's continued uncritical coverage of conspiracy narratives and UFOs since its September 2021 relaunch revealed its links to pseudoscience and conspiracy theories.

Dittrich stated that the website often creates content "that doesn't look like it's conspiracy-driven" and is occasionally shared by "apolitical people or people on the left who don't know its true purpose". Mündges said that it was not very common for a Germany-based website to be producing content in another language for an international audience, adding: "It is more common that items from the English-language media, for example the 'Stop the steal' narrative, are taken and translated into German".

In January 2022, Logically reported that Holocaust denial, neo-Nazism and other forms of hate speech were flourishing on the website's Discord and Telegram groups. Promoting or platforming Holocaust denial is illegal in Germany, with a punishment of up to five years in prison. Germany's Federal Criminal Police Office said that they were aware of Disclose.tv, but did not comment further on the extent to which they were monitoring Disclose.tv's channels.

Prior to 2021 relaunch 
In August 2016, Disclose.tv published an article falsely claiming that Edward Snowden was pronounced dead by his girlfriend in Russia. In September, Disclose.tv claimed that NASA had admitted to being in contact with aliens and had not formally announced the information due to believing that everyone was already aware of it; Snopes traced the source of the claim to Waterford Whispers News, an Irish satirical news website.

In October 2018, Disclose.tv published a story claiming that a Zimbabwean man had created an electric car that did not require charging. PolitiFact rated the claim "Pants on Fire", noting that the man's claims had already been reported on in 2015, and that the Zimbabwean technology news website TechZim had noted that the car was outside of the Law of Conservation of Energy.

COVID-19 misinformation 

A study published in March 2021 in the Online Social Networks and Media journal identified Disclose.tv as a purveyor of disinformation during the COVID-19 pandemic.

Logically noted that the website "consistently pushes anti-vaccine and anti-lockdown narratives", with many of its social media posts being focused on the "negative aspects of government responses to the COVID-19 pandemic" as well as negative effects from the COVID-19 vaccine, which are "usually presented in a misleading manner". Logically said that the website's own reporting "misrepresents developments related to COVID-19", citing an October 2021 article titled "German court declares Corona curfew unconstitutional", which referred to a March 2020 curfew in Bavaria that was retroactively ruled unconstitutional by the State Court.

In July 2021, Disclose.tv published a tweet claiming that 60% of people being admitted to hospitals in the United Kingdom had received two doses of the COVID-19 vaccine. The claim was based on an incorrect statistic given by Patrick Vallance, the Chief Scientific Advisor for the UK; Vallance issued a statement on Twitter with the correct statistic, which was that 60% of people being hospitalized were unvaccinated. Disclose.tv subsequently deleted its tweet.

In February 2022, Disclose.tv shared on Twitter a Reuters article with the incorrect headline "Japan's Kowa says that ivermectin effective against Omicron in phase III trial". The tweet was reshared by podcaster Joe Rogan. Reuters subsequently corrected its headline and article to note that the research conducted by Kowa was non-clinical research; the correction was shared by Disclose.tv, which still falsely stated that ivermectin was "effective against Omicron in phase III trial".

Operation 
Disclose.tv is owned by Futurebytes GmbH & Co. KG, which describes itself as a "private equity company" and is based in Passau. The company is owned by Uwe Braun, a Cologne-based entrepreneur. Braun has not publicly acknowledged his connection to the website.

In January 2022, Logically reported that all of the website's articles were attributed to only four writers, none of whom had links to personal websites, social media or bios, and their profile pictures were fakes generated by artificial intelligence. The writers' articles also appeared to have been written by a native German speaker.

References

External links 

 

Fake news websites
Internet properties established in 2007
Disinformation operations
Conspiracist media
Websites with far-right material
German news websites
COVID-19 misinformation
COVID-19 vaccine misinformation and hesitancy